Dorothy Cadman-Cadman, Lady Wingate-Saul (née Sharpe; 5 February 1889 – 23 December 1971) was a British archer from Lancaster.  She competed at the 1908 Summer Olympics in London.

Cadman competed at the 1908 Games in the only archery event open to women, the double National round.  She took 19th place in the event with 427 points.

She married firstly in 1903, Christopher Cadman-Cadman (1873–1931) and secondly in 1938, Sir Ernest Wingate-Saul (1873–1944). She died in York, Yorkshire, aged 83.

References

External links
Sports-Reference Biography

1889 births
1971 deaths
Archers at the 1908 Summer Olympics
Olympic archers of Great Britain
British female archers
Sportspeople from Lancashire
20th-century British women